Ernest Bower Norris,  was a prolific architect practising mostly in the north-west of England. His style fused modern, traditional and international influences, although in his ecclesiastical work he often favoured neo-byzantine or romanesque. A review of his work published in 1938 said that he had designed 80 schools and over 40 churches.  At this stage he was mid-career and continued practising for a further 30 years. His buildings are predominantly brick, although often with steel or concrete structural support.

Early life 
Ernest Bower Norris was born in Didsbury, Manchester, in 1889. His father was James Higginbotham Norris and his mother Ellen Frances Bower. His father was an estate agent and a staunch Methodist, holding lay offices in both the church and the Sunday school for most of his life. Ernest, however, converted to Roman Catholicism as a young man.

Ernest attended Manchester Grammar School and then studied architecture at Manchester School of Art whilst articled to James Harold France. Whilst there he won prizes from the Manchester Society of Architects in 1907, 1908 and 1909. He is also listed as having received book prizes in the Board of Education’s National Competitions in 1909, 1910 and 1911. The book prize was better than a commendation, but not as good as a medal. In the same 1910 competition he was awarded a free studentship. In 1909, on completing his studies he spent time in Italy surveying and sketching renaissance buildings.

There is some doubt about his movements until 1915. He spent some time working as assistant to Herbert Oswald Hill, who had been a slightly older contemporary at Manchester School of Art. Norris also spent a couple of years working for the Office of Works and nine months in the office of Edwin Lutyens. The earliest work attributed to him is the chapel at the Convent of St. Paul in Birmingham (1914) in a gothic style although other sources attribute this to Henry Sandy.

During the First World War Norris served in the Royal Naval Volunteer Reserve ( Royal Navy Reserve ) assigned to  manning anti-aircraft/zeppelin positions in London. His service record describes him as draughtsman before he enlisted. he was admitted to hospital in early 1918 suffering from malaria, and was discharged from the Navy the following year.

Style 
Norris's early churches are mostly in the Lombard-Byzantine style, possibly influenced by his travels in Italy. This style had become popular amongst English Catholics after the completion of Bentley’s Westminster Cathedral in 1903. Part of its popularity amongst Catholics was that it differentiated them from Protestant buildings, and indicated their historic lineage going back to pre-medieval Christianity. It also had the advantage of being cheaper than Gothic. The internal decorative schemes (mostly applied marble and mosaics) could be added later as funds become available. One of the best examples of the style is Church of the Sacred Heart and St Catherine of Alexandria built by Peacock in 1921. Its mosaics weren't completed until 1932. Unfortunately none of Norris's churches were ever fully mosaicked. St John the Baptist Church, Rochdale has very fine mosaics by Eric Newton (art critic) in the sanctuary. Writing about St John Fisher in West Heath the artist Johan Jones said that Norris's architecture suited his work because its "scale and detail are the unproclaiming and noble frame for the various works that adorn it".

Partnerships 
Norris joined Hill, Sandy and Norris in 1920. Henry Oswald Hill   (1888–1917) was born the year before Norris and also studied architecture at Manchester University. He joined his father’s Manchester practice but was killed in action on 21 October 1917.

Henry Thomas Sandy (1868–1922) had been practising in Stafford since 1891. In 1918 he acquired the remains of Hill’s practice and his Manchester offices. After unsuccessful partnership attempts with Herbert Powell and then a Mr Mangan, in 1920 he brought Norris into partnership. The practice of Sandy and Norris had offices in Albert Square Manchester and also at 134 Newport Road, Stafford. Unfortunately, Sandy died in 1922 at the age of 53 but Norris continued to use the styles of Hill, Sandy and Norris or just Sandy and Norris for many years.

Sometime in the 1930s Francis Maurice Reynolds joined the practice and appears to have had responsibility for running the Manchester office. This partnership was prolific during the 1930s but was dissolved on 20 September 1946. Reynolds retained the offices in Manchester but in a new practice with William Scott while Norris practised out of Stafford under the style of Sandy and Norris. Both Norris and Reynolds continued to specialise in Roman Catholic churches, generally in Romanesque or Byzantine styles, well into the 1960s., although some argue that by this stage Reynolds by this stage was the more successful of the two.

Offices 
 9 Albert Square, Manchester
 22 Greengate, Stafford
 20 Bedford Row, London

Death 
E. Bower Norris died on 24 April 1969 in Durban, South Africa. He was buried in Southern Cemetery, Manchester on 5 May 1969

Listed buildings
Several of E. Bower Norris’s buildings have been given recognised as significant heritage assets and given statutory protection as Listed buildings

Churches

Awaiting Confirmation 
 St Thomas of Cantebury, Tean (1938), Attributed to: Sandy and Norris 
 St Edward the Confessor, Macclesfield (1939), Attributed to: Reynolds, of Norris and Reynolds

Other Buildings 
 Lotus Shoe Factory, Stafford
 School – Besford Court, now divided into houses (1926 and 31)
 School  – St Peters, Rock Hill, Bromsgrove (1931)
 23–24 Bennetts Hill, Birmingham (1961)

References

Sources

1889 births
1969 deaths
People from Didsbury
Alumni of the Manchester School of Architecture